News18 Rajasthan (News18 राजस्थान) is a 24-hour Indian Hindi-language news channel based in Rajasthan, India. It is owned by Network 18.

See also
 ETV Network
 Network 18
 CNN-News18

References

External links
 News18 India's Official website

Television stations in Rajasthan
Network18 Group
Television channels and stations established in 2014
24-hour television news channels in India